So Red the Rose is a 1935 American drama film directed by King Vidor and starring Margaret Sullavan, Walter Connolly, and Randolph Scott. The Civil War-era romance is based on the 1934 novel of the same name by Stark Young.

The film did not enjoy great popularity at the box office.  After this film, Civil War films were considered box office poison in Hollywood until Bette Davis and Henry Fonda's performance in 1938's Jezebel, which was a success. This was followed by the overwhelming popularity of Gone with the Wind in 1939, an adaptation of Margaret Mitchell's bestseller of the same name. In February 2020, the film was shown at the 70th Berlin International Film Festival, as part of a retrospective dedicated to King Vidor's career.

Plot
During the American Civil War, Valette Bedford (Margaret Sullavan) waits patiently for her husband Duncan Bedford (Randolph Scott), to return home, praying that she will not become a widow.

Cast
Margaret Sullavan as Valette Bedford
Walter Connolly as Malcolm Bedford
Randolph Scott as Duncan Bedford
Janet Beecher as Sally Bedford
Elizabeth Patterson as Mary
Robert Cummings as Archie Pendleton
Harry Ellerbe as Edward Bedford
Dickie Moore as Middleton Bedford 
Charles Starrett as George McGehee 
Johnny Downs as Wounded Yankee Corporal 
Daniel L. Haynes as William Veal
Clarence Muse as Cato
James Burke as Major Rushton 
Warner Richmond as Confederate Sergeant 
Alfred Delcambre as Charles Tolliver 
Stanley Andrews as Cavalry Captain (uncredited)
Suzette Harbin as Belle (uncredited)
John Larkin as Cato's Companion (uncredited)
Lloyd Ingraham as Officer (uncredited)
Madame Sul-Te-Wan as Slave (uncredited)

References

Sources
 Andre Sennwald, "King Vidor's Screen Version of the Stark Young Novel 'So Red the Rose' at the Paramount," The New York Times, November 28, 1935.
 Rodriguez, Junius P. Encyclopedia of Slave Resistance and Rebellion. Greenwood milestones in African American history. Westport, Conn: Greenwood Press, 2007.

External links
 
 
 
 So Red the Rose at Turner Classic Movies
 a discussion with Charles Woods - Slave Rebellion in the Movies

1935 films
American historical drama films
1930s English-language films
Films directed by King Vidor
American Civil War films
Paramount Pictures films
Films based on American novels
1935 war films
1930s historical drama films
American black-and-white films
American war drama films
1935 drama films
1930s American films